Michael Mark is a Papua New Guinean rugby league footballer who represented Papua New Guinea.

Playing career
Mark played for the Port Moresby Bulldogs and Masta Mark Rangers before being selected to play for Papua New Guinea in test matches against Wales and France in 2007. He played for the PNG Residents in 2008, before joining the Hunslet Hawks in 2009. He played in three matches for Papua New Guinea in the 2010 Rugby League Four Nations. He is the uncle of Melbourne Storm Centre Justin Olam.

References

Living people
Papua New Guinean rugby league players
Papua New Guinea national rugby league team players
Hunslet R.L.F.C. players
Masta Mark Rangers players
Port Moresby Vipers players
Rugby league wingers
Year of birth missing (living people)